Events from the year 1817 in Canada.

Incumbents
Monarch: George III

Federal government
Parliament of Lower Canada: 9th (starting January 15)
Parliament of Upper Canada: 7th (starting February 4)

Governors
Governor of the Canadas: Robert Milnes
Governor of New Brunswick: George Stracey Smyth
Governor of Nova Scotia: John Coape Sherbrooke
Commodore-Governor of Newfoundland: Richard Goodwin Keats
Governor of Prince Edward Island: Charles Douglass Smith

Events
 February 4 – Francois Page petitions for monopoly of navigation of Lower Canadian Rivers, by an invention of which he produces a model.
 February 18 – Mr. McCord reads a petition for the deepening of the St. Lawrence.
 February 28 – One Goudie and others petition for a monopoly of navigation of Lake Champlain, in Canada, as like U.S. monopolists injure Canadian Commerce, by trading into Canada.

Full date unknown
 Famine in Newfoundland due to poor postwar economy.
 Nova Scotia population estimated at 78,345.
 David Thompson takes post as chief surveyor for International Boundary Commission.
 The Rush-Bagot Agreement limits the number of battleships on the Great Lakes to a total of eight.

Births
January 1 – Francis Godschall Johnson, politician (d.1894) 
January 29 – John Palliser, explorer and geographer (d.1887)
February 17 – Donald Alexander Macdonald, politician (d.1896) 
September 6 – Alexander Tilloch Galt, politician and a Father of Confederation (d.1893)
November 8 – Théophile Hamel, painter  (d.1870)
November 23 – William Jack, astronomer (d.1886)

Full date unknown
John Chipman Wade, politician and lawyer (d.1892)

Deaths
 November 23 – James Glenie, army officer, military engineer, businessman, office holder, and politician (b.1750)

References 

 
Canada
Years of the 19th century in Canada
1817 in North America